The women's duet event at the 2020 Summer Olympics in Tokyo, Japan, took place at the Tokyo Aquatics Centre from 2 to 4 August 2021. It was the 9th time the women's duet event was held at the Olympic Games.

Russian synchronized swimmers won this event for the sixth time in a row, with Svetlana Romashina becoming a six-time Olympic champion.

Competition format

The preliminary phase consisted of a free routine, then a technical routine with required elements. The scores from the two routines were added together and the top twelve duets qualified for the final. The final repeated the same free routine and the score from the final free routine was added to the score from the preliminary technical routine to decide the overall winners. Both preliminary free and technical routines starting lists were decided by random draw. For the final however, two groups were made: the last six and the first six qualified duets, the former group starting first.

The technical routine must be completed in between 2 minutes 5 seconds and 2 minutes 35 seconds. There are 3 panels of 5 judges for each routine. In the technical routine, one panel each considers execution (30% of score), impression (30%), and elements (40%). The execution and impression judges each give a single score, while the elements judges give a score for each element. Scores are between 0 and 10, with 0.1 point increments. The highest and lowest score from each panel (including within each element, for the elements panel) are discarded. The remaining scores are averaged and weighted by the percentage for that panel, with element scores weighted within the element panel by degree of difficulty. The maximum possible score is 100. In addition to a lift, jump, or throw (which can be placed anywhere in the routine, there are 5 required elements, which must be done in order:

 Difficulty 2.3: Starting in Vertical position. Full twist as one leg is bent to Bent Knee Vertical position. Another full twist while the leg is straightened. Finally, a 1080 degree continuous spin.
 Difficulty 2.9: Starting in Back Layout position. Transitions to Ballet Leg, then Surface Flamingo, then Surface Ballet Leg Double, then Submerged Back Pike positions. A 360 degree rotation ends in Surface Flamingo position. Transitions back through Ballet Leg to Back Layout position.
 Difficulty 2.8: Starting in Fishtail position. 2 rapid rotations, totaling 720 degrees. One full twist as leg is raised into Vertical position. A 720 degree continuous spin.
 Difficulty 3.0: Begins with a Cyclone into Vertical position. Half twist. Another 180 degree rotation while transitioning into Split position. Ending with a Walkout Front.
 Difficulty 2.5: Starting in Submerged Back Pike position. Thrust to Vertical; maintaining height, one leg brought down to Fishtail position. A 360 spin while returning to Vertical position.

The free routine time limits are 2 minutes 45 seconds to 3 minutes 15 seconds. There is no restriction on the routine. The 3 panels for the free routine consider execution (30% of score), artistic impression (40%), and difficulty (30%). Each judge gives a single score. The highest and lowest score from each panel are discarded, with the remaining scores averaged and weighted. The maximum possible score is 100.

Qualification 

A total of 22 duets qualify for the event. The 10 National Olympic Committees (NOC) qualified for the team competition were automatically awarded a place for duets. Each continent also received one dedicated duet place; Africa, Asia, and Oceania used the 2019 World Aquatics Championships to determine their selections, while the 2019 Pan American Games and the 2019 European Champions Cup served as qualifiers for the Americas and Europe. The final 7 places will be determined through a 2020 Olympic Qualification Tournament.

New Zealand declined the duet quota.

Schedule 

All times are Japan Standard Time (UTC+9)

The schedule for the women's duet event covers three consecutive days of competition.

Results

Preliminary 
Top 12 qualify for the Final

Final 

The final will be contested by the top 12 duets in the preliminary round. The technical routine score will carry over from the preliminary round to the final, but the free routine will be repeated.

Notes

References

2020
2020 in women's sport